Long Way is the second and final studio album by hard rock/heavy metal band Child's Play, released in 1990 through Chriplus Records. It was self-produced by John Allen and Nicky Kay. It is the first and only album to feature new vocalist, Tommy McRae who replaced founding member Brian Jack, who left to pursue a solo career. This album had four singles released: Long Way, "Foolish Pride", "I Can't Believe", and a live version of "Wind" — a single from the previous album, Rat Race. Each of these became a number one requested song as well.

Track listing

Personnel

Child'ƨ Play
Tommy McRae - lead vocals, rhythm guitars
Nicky Kay - guitars, backing vocals
Idzi - bass, backing vocals
John Allen - drums, backing vocals, lead vocals on "Never Make It On Time"

Additional musicians
Jim Dorsey - piano on "Kind of Life"
Brian Jack - background vocals and guitar on "Never Make It On Time"

Production
John Allen and Nicky Kay – producers 
Arnold Geher - engineers, mixing
Marty Wachter - engineers on "Woman"; engineers, mixing on "Never Make It On Time"

References

External links
 Official Site (archive)

Child's Play (band) albums
1993 albums
Chriplus Records albums
Albums produced by John Allen
Albums produced by Nicky Kay